A glucuronide, also known as glucuronoside, is any substance produced by linking glucuronic acid to another substance via a glycosidic bond. The glucuronides belong to the glycosides.

Glucuronidation, the conversion of chemical compounds to glucuronides, is a method that animals use to assist in the excretion of toxic substances, drugs or other substances that cannot be used as an energy source.  Glucuronic acid is attached via a glycosidic bond to the substance, and the resulting glucuronide, which has a much higher water solubility than the original substance, is eventually excreted by the kidneys.

Enzymes that cleave the glycosidic bond of a glucuronide are called glucuronidases.

Examples 
 Miquelianin (Quercetin 3-O-glucuronide)
 Morphine-6-glucuronide
 Scutellarein-7-glucuronide

References 

 
Toxicology